The DMZ Campaign (1969–71) was a military campaign by the United States Army, United States Marine Corps (USMC) and the Army of the Republic of Vietnam (ARVN) against the People’s Army of Vietnam (PAVN) along the Vietnamese Demilitarized Zone (DMZ) in northern Quảng Trị Province from 1969 to 1971 during the Vietnam War.

With the departure of the 3rd Marine Division from South Vietnam in late 1969, the U.S. Army expanded its operations along the DMZ until it too was withdrawn in mid-late 1971 when responsibility fell entirely on the ARVN.

Background
Prior to 1968 the defense of the DMZ had been the responsibility of the 3rd Marine Division under the control of III Marine Amphibious Force (III MAF) and the ARVN 1st Division. In early 1968 the U.S. Army’s 1st Cavalry Division moved to I Corps to conduct Operation Jeb Stuart and to participate in Operation Pegasus, the relief of Khe Sanh Combat Base. On 27 January 1968 COMUSMACV General William Westmoreland ordered the establishment of a new MACV/ARVN headquarters (known as MACV Forward) at Phu Bai Combat Base to control the war in Quảng Trị and Thừa Thiên Provinces. MACV Forward would be commanded by deputy COMUSMACV General Creighton Abrams. The outbreak of the Tet Offensive delayed the establishment of MACV Forward and it would not begin operating until 12 February.

Due to uncertainties regarding the chain of command caused by the establishment of MACV Forward, on 17 February Westmoreland announced that he planned to form a provisional corps in northern I Corps in early March that would consist of the 1st Cavalry Division, the 101st Airborne Division (Airmobile) and the 3rd Marine Division. MACV (Forward) would then be deactivated and the new Provisional Corps, Vietnam under the command of Lieutenant General William B. Rosson would be subordinate to III MAF. Provisional Corps became operational on 10 March. On 15 July XXIV Corps was re-activated to replace Provisional Corps, Vietnam.

On 1 September the U.S. Army’s 1st Brigade, 5th Infantry Division (Mechanized) assumed responsibility for the defense of the eastern DMZ from the 1st Marine Regiment as part of Operation Napoleon/Saline. With the conclusion of Operation Napoleon/Saline on 9 December 1968, the Napoleon/Saline operational area was absorbed into the Operation Kentucky operational area under the control of Marine Task Force Bravo.

At the beginning of 1969 XXIV Corps comprised the 101st Airborne Division (Airmobile) in Thừa Thiên Province and the 1st Brigade, 5th Infantry Division (Mechanized) responsible for the coastal lowlands of Quảng Trị Province while the 3rd Marine Division remained responsible for the highlands of western Quảng Trị Province. Operation Kentucky concluded on 28 February 1969.

Operation

March 1969
The attack was repulsed with 20 PAVN killed and 10 individual weapons captured; U.S. losses were 13 killed.

The Marines called in artillery fire and killed 20 PAVN and captured one and 13 individual and one crew-served weapons.

At 17:30 an aerial observer received fire 3 miles west of Con Thien and called artillery fire onto the position killing four PAVN and destroying three .51 cal machine guns. On 15 March at 06:00 15 122/140mm rockets hit Cửa Việt Base. The Marines were reinforced by amphibious vehicles at 07:30 and the battle continued until 10:40 when the PAVN withdrew leaving ten dead and two captured and one 82mm mortar.

As the patrol was returning to their base they were attacked again. U.S. losses were five killed and four Vietnamese civilians were killed. From 23 March to 3 April the 1st Brigade conducted Operation Montana Mauler near Firebase Fuller.

At 16:00 the same unit encountered another PAVN force killing a further four; U.S. losses were one killed. The unit was supported by armor, artillery, helicopter gunships and airstrikes and the PAVN withdrew at 18:30 leaving 120 dead and seven individual and three crew-served weapons; U.S. losses were 14 killed. The unit was supported by artillery and tactical airstrikes causing four secondary explosions. The PAVN withdrew at 18:30 leaving 68 dead and 16 individual weapons; U.S. losses were one killed.

April
Operation Montana Mauler concluded on 3 April with 271 PAVN killed and 23 individual and six crew-served weapons captured; U.S. losses were 38 killed.

May
The PAVN withdrew at 16:00 leaving seven dead and one individual and one crew-served weapons; U.S. losses were seven killed.

The bodies of six PAVN were seen in the strike area. The Marines attacked supported by artillery and the PAVN withdrew leaving five dead; U.S. losses were two killed.

The Marines returned fire and were supported by AC-47 Spooky gunships forcing the PAVN to withdraw; U.S. losses were eight killed. On 12 May between 02:30 and 18:30 the PAVN fired mortars and rockets at U.S. bases near Gio Linh, the Rockpile and Con Thien. Naval gunfire was directed onto the firing positions causing ten secondary explosions.

An aerial observer later saw 12 PAVN dead in the battle area.

The Marines directed artillery fire onto the firing position. At 17:45 a unit of the 3rd Marine Regiment in positions 6 miles north of the Rockpile received mortar fire and directed artillery onto the firing position. On 27 May at 01:05 Cửa Việt Base was hit by ten 122mm rockets and naval gunfire was directed onto the firing position resulting in one secondary explosion. At 19:30 an aerial observer saw PAVN at Khe Sanh and directed airstrikes on the location killing ten.

June
At 14:00 an aerial observer received fire 6 miles west-southwest of Con Thien killing the observer and the plane returned to base. Artillery and airstrikes were directed onto the firing position.

A Marine reaction force was landed by helicopter and supported the patrol until contact was lost. At 16:30 as a CH-46 attempted to extract the patrol it was hit by 12.7mm fire and crash-landed nearby. At 18:40 another CH-46 was also shot down and crash-landed. Artillery fire was directed onto the firing position and overnight the group moved overland to an evacuation site protected by AC-47 fire. On 9 June at 04:30 the group met up with another Marine relief force and on the evening of 10 June the wounded and aircrew were evacuated while the other Marines continued patrolling. At 17:50 an aerial observer received fire 4 miles north of Gio Linh.

The unit returned fire supported by helicopter gunships and the PAVN withdrew at 05:30 leaving 35 dead; U.S. losses were ten killed. The Marines attacked supported by artillery and airstrikes and the PAVN withdrew at 18:30 leaving 35 dead and four individual weapons; U.S. losses were nine killed. At 17:10 an aerial observer received fire 4 miles north of Gio Linh and directed naval gunfire from the USS Saint Paul onto the position causing a secondary explosion and destroying four bunkers.

The unit returned fire and the PAVN withdrew leaving 25 dead and two captured and 18 individual and four crew-served weapons; U.S. losses were two killed. The PAVN withdrew at 16:00 leaving ten dead.

July
A forward observer directed mortar and artillery fire onto the firing position. At 09:00 the same unit was hit by ten 122mm rockets causing minimal damage and artillery fire was directed onto the firing position.

On 23 July at 02:25 a unit of the 3rd Marines located 4 miles northeast of Con Thien received mortar fire and a forward observer directed artillery onto the firing position.

The PAVN withdrew leaving nine dead and one individual weapon. The Marines returned fire supported by artillery, helicopter gunships and an AC-47. The PAVN withdrew leaving one dead and one individual weapon; U.S. losses were three killed. The fighting continued until the PAVN withdrew leaving 12 dead.

The PAVN withdrew at 15:15 leaving 13 dead and eight individual weapons; U.S. losses were three killed. On 31 July at 00:20 a unit of the 3rd Marines ambushed a PAVN force killing six and capturing ten individual weapons. Infantry from the 1st Brigade moving towards the crash site an engaged a PAVN company. The Infantry rescued the crew and as they were returning to their original position engaged another PAVN force. The PAVN eventually withdrew leaving 17 dead and three individual and one crew-served weapons; U.S. losses were four killed and two Kit Carson Scouts killed.

August
On 5 August at 17:30 a U.S. firebase 4 miles south-southeast of Con Thien received fire and artillery fire was directed onto the firing position. At the same time another aerial observer saw ten PAVN 7 miles west of Con Thien and directed artillery fire onto the location causing three secondary explosions. At 19:15 Con Thien was hit by five 140mm rockets causing minimal damage, artillery fire was directed onto the firing position 4.5 miles to the west.

The Marines were supported by artillery, helicopter gunships and airstrikes and the PAVN withdrew at 17:00 leaving 29 dead and seven individual and one crew-served weapons; U.S. losses were four killed. At midday a unit of the 1st Brigade operating 4 miles west-southwest of Con Thien engaged a PAVN company and were supported by artillery and helicopter gunships. The PAVN withdrew at 14:20 leaving 56 dead and 23 individual and three crew-served weapons; U.S. losses were three killed. At 14:00 another unit of the 3rd Marines patrolling 4 miles northwest of the Rockpile engaged a PAVN force killing five; U.S. losses were one killed. At 16:35 a forward observer saw PAVN fire being directed at a 1st Brigade unit 4 miles west-southwest of Con Thien and directed artillery fire onto the location.

At 04:15 on 10 August another unit of the 3rd Marines was attacked by two PAVN companies. The Marines were supported by artillery, helicopter gunships and an AC-47. The PAVN withdrew at 06:15, however the PAVN then attacked the first position again before being forced to withdraw. At 10:30 as the Marines swept the area they were hit by mortar fire. Total PAVN losses were 37 dead, while Marine losses were 19 killed. The PAVN were identified as coming from the 9th Regiment of the 304th Division. The PAVN withdrew after two hours. At 09:00 the same firebase was again hit by mortar fire and artillery fire was directed onto the firing location. The PAVN withdrew and the Marines continued their patrol, later engaging two PAVN platoons in bunkers. The PAVN withdrew at 15:30 leaving 18 dead and 11 individual and two crew-served weapons.

The Marines triggered their ambush killing ten PAVN.

On 21 August at 11:40 an aerial observer saw nine PAVN 5 miles west of Con Thien and directed artillery fire onto the location killing five. At 13:30 another aerial observer operating in the same area saw six PAVN near a bunker complex 800m south of the earlier target and directed artillery fire onto the location destroying two bunkers and killing one PAVN. The unit returned fired supported by artillery and an AC-47 forcing the PAVN to withdraw; U.S. losses were one killed. At 18:30 a unit of the 3rd Marines operating 4 miles northwest of the Rockpile was ambushed by a PAVN force. The action continued until 22:00 when the PAVN withdrew leaving eight dead; U.S. losses were six killed. On 23 August at 12:10 a unit of the 3rd Marines operating 5 miles northwest of the Rockpile was hit by 30 82mm mortar rounds causing minimal damage, artillery was directed onto the firing position.

On 27 August at 18:10 an aerial observer saw 4-6 PAVN 4 miles west of Con Thien and directed artillery fire onto the area killing one.

The Marines returned fire and the PAVN withdrew. The Marines were attacked again at 05:05 and the Marines returned fire and the PAVN withdrew at 05:55 leaving six dead and three individual and one crew-served weapon; U.S. losses were three killed.

September
On 5 September at 13:55 an aerial observer received fire 200m south of the Ben Hai River, artillery and airstrikes were directed onto the location destroying a bunker. On 6 September at 18:50 a U.S./ARVN firebase at Gio Linh received mortar fire and naval gunfire from the USS Saint Paul was directed onto the firing position.

At 13:00 a unit of the 3rd Marines patrolling 3 miles north-northwest of the Rockpile attacked three PAVN in a bunker supported by artillery and helicopter gunships. The PAVN withdrew leaving seven dead and one individual weapon. At 07:15 a U.S./ARVN firebase at Gio Linh received mortar fire causing minimal damage. At 21:00 a unit of the ARVN 2nd Regiment in a night defensive position 4 miles east of Gio Linh received mortar fire and directed naval gunfire from the USS Saint Paul onto the firing position.

On 15 September at 08:20 a unit of the 3rd Marines engaged a PAVN force 5 miles northwest of the Rockpile. Artillery and air support was provided and the PAVN withdrew at 15:30; U.S. losses were four killed.

The PAVN withdrew after 20 minutes leaving ten dead and the Marines were extracted with one Marine being killed after being struck by a helicopter blade during extraction. At 02:00 the PAVN attacked the position and the Marines fought back supported by artillery, helicopter gunships, airstrikes and an AC-47. The PAVN withdrew at 03:00 but at 04:00 another attack was made from a different direction. The PAVN withdrew after 30 minutes but mortar fire continued to hit the Marines until dawn when reinforcements arrived. The bodies of 41 PAVN and 12 individual and two crew-served weapons were found around the perimeter; U.S. losses were 16 killed.

The Marines were reinforced but the attacks continued until the PAVN withdrew after 08:50 leaving three dead; U.S. losses were one killed. At 20:00 a 3rd Marines reconnaissance unit received fire 4 miles west of the Rockpile and returned fire supported by artillery killing five PAVN. On 22 September at 17:45 a U.S./ARVN firebase near Gio Linh received mortar fire and artillery fire was directed onto the firing position.

The Marines returned fire and the PAVN withdrew; U.S. losses were two killed. The unit returned fire supported by airstrikes and in the afternoon another unit reinforced. The PAVN withdrew at 15:00 leaving 15 dead and one individual and five crew-served weapons; U.S. losses were three killed.

October
The unit returned fire supported by artillery and the PAVN withdrew leaving 14 dead and one captured and four individual and seven crew-served weapons; U.S. losses were one killed. On this day units from the 101st Airborne Division (Airmobile) arrived in Quảng Trị Province to replace the elements of the 3rd Marine Division which were withdrawing from South Vietnam in Operation Keystone Cardinal. The PAVN withdrew at 18:20; U.S. losses were two killed.

The Marines returned fire supported by artillery and an AC-47. The PAVN withdrew at 01:35 leaving nine dead and two AK-47s; U.S. losses were eight killed.

The unit returned fire supported by artillery and airstrikes killing thee PAVN. At the same time another Division unit 6 miles north-northwest of the Rockpile received mortar fire.

December
Several minutes later the observer received fire 300m to the northeast and directed artillery fire onto the location. On 20 December at 23:50 a unit of the 1st Brigade received fire from a PAVN platoon near the north bank of the Cửa Việt River and returned fire supported by helicopter gunships and a United States Navy Patrol Boat, River (PBR) forcing the PAVN to withdraw.

January 1970
The PAVN withdrew at 04:10 leaving 16 dead and 11 individual weapons and two RPG-7 launchers. At midday an aerial observer received fire 4 miles north-northwest of Gio Linh. At 15:15 an ARVN armored cavalry unit located at Firebase Gio Linh received mortar fire and directed artillery fire onto the firing position. At 16:40 Firebase Gio Linh again received mortar fire and artillery was directed onto the firing position.

February
On 6 February it was announced that effective 9 March III MAF would become a subordinate command of XXIV Corps as Army forces had become the predominant military element in I Corps.

March
The battle continued for two hours when the PAVN withdrew leaving 30 dead and 15 individual weapons and two RPG launchers; U.S. losses were two killed. At 12:20 a helicopter gunship from the air cavalry squadron of the 101st Airborne received fire 5 miles southeast of Khe Sanh and attacked the firing position killing seven PAVN.

Troops from the air cavalry squadron of the 101st Airborne were landed nearby and engaged a PAVN force with support from helicopter gunships and airstrikes. Another unit was landed to reinforce and the fighting continued throughout the night. The PAVN withdrew leaving 16 dead and the units were able to reach the crash site finding both crewmen dead. Air cavalry troops were landed in the area and engaged the PAVN until they withdrew; U.S. losses were one killed.

April
On 1 April between 14:40 and 21:00 units of the 1st Brigade at four different locations received a total of 110 rounds of 60/82mm mortar fire and five 122/140mm rockets causing minimal damage. The PAVN withdrew after eight hours leaving 27 dead; U.S. losses were five killed. The PAVN withdrew at 14:45 leaving 24 dead; U.S. losses were two killed.

The unit returned fire supported by helicopter gunships and an AC-119 gunship. The PAVN withdrew at 09:00 leaving four dead; U.S. losses were two killed and one M551 and two M113s destroyed. The unit returned fire and the PAVN withdrew at 06:30 leaving 16 dead and one captured and three individual and five crew-served weapons; U.S. losses were one killed.

The unit returned fire and the PAVN withdrew leaving 33 dead and 21 individual and three crew-served weapons. The PAVN withdrew at midnight but sniper fire continued until 02:00. PAVN losses were nine killed and six individual and one crew-served weapons captured. At 23:00 a trip flare was activated on the perimeter of Mai Loc Camp altering the camp’s defenders. At 02:35 on 10 April the camp was hit by 75-100 82mm mortar and RPG rounds followed by a sapper attack by the PAVN 66th Regiment. The Civilian Irregular Defense Group (CIDG) forces, their Special Forces advisers and artillerymen with M42 Dusters defended the camp. The sappers penetrated the perimeter but were unable to reach the inner perimeter and tactical operations center. At 03:40 a unit from the 1st Brigade reinforced the camp and helicopter gunships and a Republic of Vietnam Air Force (RVNAF) AC-47 provided fire support. The PAVN withdrew by 04:55 leaving 19 dead; U.S. losses were six killed and 19 CIDG killed.

The defenders returned fire and the PAVN withdrew. At dusk ARVN soldiers sweeping the perimeter made sporadic contact with PAVN. PAVN losses were 71 killed and nine captured and 11 individual and six crew-served weapons captured; U.S. losses were four killed and one M41 and one M-113 destroyed. Between 10:10 and 15:45 Firebase Fuller west of Cam Lo received 70 120mm mortar rounds causing minimal damage.

On 21 April a unit of the 1st Brigade at Firebase Fuller received ten rounds of 120mm mortar fire causing minimal damage.

On 30 April at 00:55 a unit of the 1st Brigade at Firebase Fuller received mortar fire followed by a sapper attack. The defenders returned fire supported by artillery and helicopter gunships and the PAVN withdrew leaving 16 dead. South of Quảng Trị the ARVN 1st Battalion, 1st Regiment engaged a PAVN force killing 14 and capturing three individual weapons and 10 tons or rice; ARVN losses were six killed.

May
On 5 May 16 km southeast of Khe Sanh, units of the ARVN 1st Battalion, 54th Regiment engaged a force from the PAVN 66th Regiment in three separate contacts killing 83 PAVN; ARVN losses were eight killed. At 23:05 the ARVN 4th Battalion, 3rd Regiment in a night defensive position 5 km northeast of Gio Linh was probed by PAVN forces. The defenders engaged the PAVN supported by flareships and gunships and the PAVN withdrew leaving 26 dead; ARVN losses were one killed. On 6 May at 05:30 Firebase Henderson occupied by Company A, 2nd Battalion, 501st Infantry Regiment and a unit of the ARVN 54th Regiment, received mortar and RPG fire followed by ground attacks from the northwest by the PAVN 66th Regiment. The 2-hour engagement cost the PAVN 29 dead while the defenders sustained 32 U.S. and 19 ARVN killed and three M114 155 mm howitzers heavily damaged. On 7 May, 16 km southeast of Khe Sanh the ARVN 1/54th uncovered a grave site containing 97 PAVN. Also on 7 May between 07:20 and 09:00 in two separate contacts 15 to 18 km east-southeast of Khe Sanh the ARVN 1/54th made contact with the PAVN killing 32 while losing one killed.  On 10 May at 06:00 30 rounds of 82mm mortar fire fell on Henderson killing three ARVN. On 13 May the ARVN Hac Bao Reconnaissance Company of the 1st Division operating west of Cam Lo received ten rounds of 82mm mortar fire killing nine ARVN. On 14 May at 00:40, the Hac Bao Company operating 15 km west of Cam Lo received 300 rounds of 82mm mortar fire and at 07:45 a further 250 mixed 60 and 82mm mortar rounds.

On 15 May at 22:50 15 km south-southeast of Khe Sanh helicopter gunships from Company C, 4th Battalion, 77th Aerial Rocket Artillery Regiment received 23mm antiaircraft fire. The helicopters engaged the PAVN with on-board ordnance killing 35 PAVN and destroying two trucks. On 18 May at 08:25 three km southwest of Gio Linh the ARVN 2nd Battalion, 1st Regiment defensive position received a ground attack from a PAVN company. The ARVN forces were supported by artillery and gunships and the PAVN withdrew leaving 28 dead; ARVN losses were three killed. On 19 and 20 May units of the ARVN 1st Division operating 12 km west of Cam Lo engaged PAVN forces in sporadic contacts killing 41. On 22 May at 22:10 21 km east of Khe Sanh the ARVN 4th Battalion, 54th Regiment, in a night defensive position 21 km east of the village, received a mortar attack followed by a ground assault. Supported by artillery and airstrikes the ARVN repelled the attack killing 52 PAVN for the loss of 14 ARVN.  On 27 May at 04:00 16 km southeast of Quảng Trị the ARVN 1st Battalion, 1st Regiment and supporting artillery killed 14 PAVN; ARVN losses were seven killed.  On 31 May a hamlet near Cam Lo defended by Popular Force (PF) and People's Self-Defense Force (PSDF) forces received a mortar and ground attack from a PAVN force losing 13 killed.

June
During the first week of June, the PAVN 9th Battalion, 66th Regiment struck Firebase Tun Tavern with mortar fire followed by a ground attack. The defenders returned fire supported by artillery, helicopter gunships and airstrikes. PAVN losses were 136 killed while ARVN losses were 41 killed and U.S. losses two killed. On 23 June at 06:50 while searching an area 30 km southeast of Khe Sanh, the ARVN 1st Battalion, 1st Regiment engaged a PAVN force. The ARVN called in artillery and airstrikes to assist and a sweep of the area after contact was lost resulted in the discovery of a PAVN base camp containing numerous huts, buildings and a large supply of food and munitions, in addition to 47 PAVN dead. On 28 June near Gio Linh a unit of the ARVN 1st Battalion, 2nd Regiment engaged a PAVN company from the 270th Regiment killing 41 PAVN and capturing two.

July
On 1 July southeast of Quảng Trị, elements of the 121st and 122nd Regional Force (RF) companies, and the Hải Lăng District PF Platoon were the target of a series of coordinated small-scale attacks in the lowland of Hải Lăng District. The ARVN 2nd Troop, 11th Armored Cavalry Squadron and the 3rd Battalion, 1st Regiment reinforced and the Hac Bao Company. The PAVN attempted to break contact and disperse, but ARVN elements regained contact killing 135 PAVN from the 808th Battalion and 6th Battalion 812th Regiment; ARVN losses were 16 killed. On 6 July in the afternoon a Ranger unit from the 101st Airborne operating 13 km northwest of Khe Sanh engaged a PAVN infiltration group killing ten with artillery and helicopter gunship support. On 8 July at 11:30 4 km southwest of Khe Sanh, elements of Troop A, 2/17th Cavalry attacked a 250 strong PAVN force and Troop D was inserted, engaging the PAVN to the west. The PAVN withdrew after eight hours leaving 139 dead and four captured; U.S. losses were four killed. Prisoner interrogations established that the units involved were the PAVN 1st and 2nd Battalions, 9th Regiment. On 11 July, 4 km southwest of Khe Sanh a unit of the ARVN 3rd Regiment found 143 PAVN killed by airstrikes 24-hours earlier. Nearby on 12 July while on a search and clear operation, elements of the same battalion engaged an estimated 40 PAVN. A search of the area revealed 14 PAVN bodies and 36 graves believed to have been there 24 to 48 hours. On 12 July at 08:00 31 km southwest of Quảng Trị a unit of the ARVN 1st Battalion, 1st Regiment on a search and-clear mission found 65 PAVN killed by air strikes 24-hours earlier. On 24 July at midday 41 km south-southwest of Khe Sanh. The ARVN 2nd Battalion, 1st Regiment, on a search and clear operation, found a PAVN base camp with 53 PAVN killed by airstrikes approximately 2-weeks earlier.

August
On 2 August at 10:00 24 km southwest of Quảng Trị the ARVN 2nd Battalion, 1st Regiment on a search operation killed 15 PAVN in a brief contact losing one killed. On 3 August 5 km south-southwest of Cam Lo a PAVN force was observed by Troop C, 3/5th Cavalry Regiment, while in night defensive positions, and engaged with organic weapons, supported by tank fire, artillery and gunships. The PAVN 31st Regiment lost 16 killed while U.S. losses were one killed. Later the same morning a second attack was launched by the PAVN 31st Regiment and it was repulsed killing a further 15. On 6 August 24 km southwest of Quảng Trị the ARVN 2nd Battalion, 1st Regiment on a search operation killed 13 PAVN in a six-hour battle, losing one killed.

On 12 August at 07:30, 15 km southeast of Quảng Trị, the 49th PF Platoon was attacked by RPG-2 fire, the contact continued and elements of the ARVN 54th Regiment, the 11th Armored Cavalry Squadron, two RF Companies and another PF Platoon were inserted into the area. The battle lasted 12 hours and PAVN losses were 127 killed, 14 captured and 45 weapons captured; ARVN losses were 17 killed. On 13 August in the same area, elements of the ARVN 54th Regiment and the 11th Armored Cavalry Squadron ACS had a 5-hour battle with an estimated two PAVN companies killing 109 and capturing 14 and 34 weapons; ARVN losses were four killed. Also on 13 August 8 and 16 km southwest of Quảng Trị an RF Co battled PAVN forces in two separate engagements, killing 30 and capturing five and 10 weapons. On 14 August 7 km east of Quảng Trị, RF units killed 19 PAVN and captured six weapons while losing one killed.

On 16 August a unit of the ARVN 2nd Battalion, 2nd Regiment at Firebase Fuller was hit by 70 120mm mortar rounds killing 14 ARVN and destroying 20 bunkers. The ARVN artillery returned fire on the suspected firing positions. On 17 August from 06:00-18:00 Company B, 3rd Platoon, 2nd Battalion, 502nd Infantry Regiment, on a sweep of the area 23 km southwest of Quảng Trị found 34 PAVN bodies believed to have been killed the night before during an attack on the Company’s night defensive position. On 18 August at 04:00 33 km southeast of Khe Sanh the ARVN 1st Battalion, 3rd Regiment while in a night defensive position was attacked by an estimated PAVN battalion. The unit returned fire supported by artillery killing 38 PAVN. On 19 August 23 km southwest of Quảng Trị, Company B 3rd Platoon, 2nd Battalion, 502nd Infantry supported by helicopters and airstrikes killed 25 PAVN while losing one killed.

September
On 7 September the ARVN 3rd Battalion, 3rd Regiment while on a sweep mission 24 km southwest of Quảng Trị found 21 PAVN killed by air the previous day. On 14 September near Firebase Barnett 24 km southwest of Quảng Trị, an ambush element from the ARVN 4th Battalion, 3rd Regiment killed 25 PAVN from the 9th Regiment; ARVN losses were five killed. On 18 September at 03:00 35 km southeast of Khe Sanh, aircraft of Company C, 2/17th Cavalry were conducting a forward looking infrared mission when they located and attacked 40 PAVN killing 18. On 20 September west of Gio Linh, a UH-1 from Company C, 158th Assault Helicopter Battalion was shot down while inserting a reconnaissance team from the 75th Ranger Regiment. Later in the morning, Company A, 1st Brigade received 60/82mm mortar fire after being inserted to secure the crash site. U.S. losses were four killed and seven missing.

October
On 8 October at 11:10 9 km southwest of Khe Sanh, helicopter gunships from Company C 3/17th Cavalry engaged forces from the Quảng Trị Rear Service killing 26. On 14 October west of Cam Lo, a unit of the ARVN 2nd Regiment engaged a PAVN company from the 27th Regiment killing three and capturing 100 RPG grenades and 200 82mm mortar rounds. On 17 October at 09:10 the ARVN 2nd Troop, 7th Cavalry and the U.S. 14th Engineer Battalion, while conducting a minesweeping operation 13 km south of Quang Tri, were ambushed by elements of the PAVN 808th Battalion. The ARVN/U.S. troops returned fire killing 19 PAVN; U.S. losses were two killed and two M113s destroyed.

November
On 14 November 14 km south-southwest of Quảng Trị the ARVN 3rd Company, 4th Battalion, 1st Regiment engaged elements of the PAVN 814th Battalion. The PAVN withdrew at 14:00 hours leaving 21 dead; ARVN losses were one killed. On 22 November at 15:45 105 82mm mortar rounds hit Firebase Fuller killing one ARVN.

December
The huts and tunnels were then destroyed.

On 18 December 45 km west of Quảng Trị, elements of the 2/17th Air Cavalry, supported by helicopter flareships, engaged 15 PAVN from the 246th Regiment killing ten. An aerorifle platoon was landed in the area and engaged a PAVN force which withdrew leaving seven dead and one radio; U.S. losses were one Kit Carson Scout killed. On 25 December south of Quảng Trị a unit of the ARVN 3rd Battalion, 1st Regiment, engaged PAVN from the 808th Battalion killing 11. On 27 December at 09:45 the 95th, 98th, 100th, 164th and 170th PF Platoons operating 7 km southeast of Gio Linh, engaged a company of the PAVN 270th Regiment supported by helicopter gunships from the 1st Brigade killing 22 PAVN.

1971
Throughout early 1971 U.S. and ARVN forces in Quảng Trị Province were largely focused on Operation Lam Son 719. On 9 July Firebase Charlie 2, the last U.S. firebase along the DMZ was turned over to the ARVN. On 7 August the 1st Brigade, 5th Infantry Division (Mechanized) left South Vietnam.

Aftermath
With the departure of U.S. ground forces from Quảng Trị Province, responsibility for the security of the area fell on the ARVN which raised the 3rd Division to defend the area.

References

1969 in Vietnam
1970 in Vietnam
1971 in Vietnam
Battles and operations of the Vietnam War in 1969
Battles and operations of the Vietnam War in 1970
Battles and operations of the Vietnam War in 1971
Battles involving the United States
Battles involving Vietnam
History of Quảng Trị province